Emanuel Hoffmann (4 May 1896 – 3 October 1932) was a Swiss jurist and art collector and the son of Fritz Hoffmann-La Roche, a founder of the pharmaceutical company Hoffmann-La Roche (also known as Roche)

Biography 
He attended the humanist gymnasium in Basel, Switzerland, and studied law at the Universities of Basel and Bern. In 1921 he married Maja Stehlin. Since 1921 he worked at the families company Roche in Basel, between 1925 and 1930 he was in charge of the companies branch in Brussels, Belgium. In Belgium, he and his wife began to collect art from painters like Joan Miró, Pablo Picasso, Paul Klee or Max Ernst. In 1930 he returned to Basel, where from 1932 onwards he was a vice-director at the headquarters of Roche in Basel. In 1932 he was elected the president of the Art Association of Basel. The same year, he died from a car accident.

Personal life 
In 1921 he married Maja Stehlin with who he had two sons and one daughter. His son Lukas Hoffmann was best known for being a co-founder of the World Wide Fund for Nature.

Legacy 

References 

Swiss jurists
1932 deaths
1896 births
Swiss art collectors